Brighton is a city in the Detroit metropolitan area in southeastern Livingston County, Michigan, United States. As of the 2010 census, the city population was 7,444. Brighton forms part of the South Lyon-Howell-Brighton Urban Area. It is one of two incorporated cities in Livingston County, and incorporates land that was part of Brighton, Green Oak and Genoa townships.

History
Brighton was established in 1832. It was incorporated as a village in 1867 and as a city in 1928.

Geography

Topography 

Transportation

Major Thoroughfares

Grand River Avenue

Climate

Brighton exhibits what is known as a continental climate biome. Within the heart of the Great Lakes region, Brighton weather ranges from warm summers with occasional thunderstorms to cold, dry winters with moderate to heavy snowfall.

Demographics

The city's median household income in 2009 was $47,668, and the median family income was $77,105. Males had a median income of $48,554 versus $30,877 for females. The city's per capita income was $29,781. Brighton's surrounding townships and communities, such as Brighton and Genoa Township, have median household incomes in excess of $90,000, making it one of the more prosperous places in Michigan. About 3.0% of families and 5.1% of the population were below the poverty line, including 5.9% of those under age 18 and 5.2% of those age 65 or over in the 2000 census.

2010 census
At the 2010 census the city had 7,444 people, 3,603 households, and 1,811 families. The city's racial makeup was 96.0% White, 0.7% African American, 0.4% Native American, 1.1% Asian, 0.6% from other races, and 1.2% from two or more races. Hispanic or Latino of any race were 2.3%.

There were 3,603 households, of which 22.3% had children under the age of 18 living with them, 38.2% were married couples living together, 8.9% had a female householder with no husband present, 3.1% had a male householder with no wife present, and 49.7% were non-families. 42.7% of households were one person and 19.8% were one person aged 65 or older. The average household size was 2.02 and the average family size was 2.81.

The median age was 43.4 years. 19% of the city's population was under age 18; 7.1% was between age 18 and 24; 26% was from age 25 to 44; 26.1% was from 45 to 64, and 21.7% were age 65 or older. The city's gender makeup was 46.2% male and 53.8% female.

2000 census
At the 2000 census the city had 6,701 people, 3,103 households, and 1,746 families. The city's racial makeup was 99.76% White, 0.034% African American, 0.042% Native American, 0.21% Asian, 0.39% from other races, and 0.0093% from two or more races. Hispanic or Latino of any race were 1.48%.

There were 3,103 households, of which 25.7% had children under the age of 18 living with them, 44.3% were married couples living together, 9.1% had a female householder with no husband present, and 43.7% were non-families. 37.8% of households were one person and 15.5% were one person aged 65 or older.  The average household size was 2.15 and the average family size was 2.87.

21.7% of the city's population was under age 18, 8.5% was from age 18 to 24, 31.9% was from age 25 to 44, 21.4% was from age 45 to 64, and 16.6% was age 65 or older. The median age was 37 years. For every 100 females, there were 87.6 males. For every 100 females age 18 and over, there were 81.8 males.

Government
The city of Brighton's wastewater treatment plant facility is in Hamburg Township and services the city of Brighton and parts of Genoa, Brighton, and Hamburg townships. The city's two water plants also serve the city and parts of Genoa, Brighton and Hamburg townships.

Fire service for the city is provided through a separate governmental entity called the Brighton Area Fire Authority, which also serves the Townships of Brighton and Genoa.

Library services for the city is provided through a separate governmental entity called the Brighton District Library, which also serves the townships of Brighton, Genoa and Green Oak.

Recreation services for the city is provided through a separate governmental entity called the Southeastern Livingston County Recreation Authority, which also serves the townships of Brighton, Genoa and Green Oak, as well as the Brighton Area Schools.

Business district
The town's major business districts are downtown and on either side of town. Brighton has two major shopping malls: Brighton Mall on the north side of town off of I-96 Exit 145 is a former enclosed mall which was rebuilt in 1996 as a power center, and Green Oak Village Place is a lifestyle center complex on the east side of town.

Several initiatives to revitalize downtown, such as streetscape improvements and displayed art, have been well received. A bronze nude entitled Decision Pending, purchased as part of the 2006 Brighton Biennial, generated some controversy and an unsuccessful campaign to relocate the statue.

Notable people 

 
 Drew Henson, quarterback for the Houston Texans, Dallas Cowboys, Minnesota Vikings, and Detroit Lions; attended Brighton High School
 Jonathon Merrill, defenseman for NHL's Detroit Red Wings; was raised in Brighton
 Kyle Schultz, commissioner of Major League Wiffleball, manager, and 6-time champion of Western Wildcats
 Mickey Stanley, center fielder for the Detroit Tigers; World Series champion (1968); lives in Brighton
 Morgan Trent, cornerback for the Cincinnati Bengals, Indianapolis Colts, Jacksonville Jaguars, and Washington Redskins; lived in Brighton

Gallery

Education
Brighton Area Schools has 2 middle schools-Scranton and Maltby, a high school, and a few elementary schools. There is 1 private high school, Livingston Christian High School, and a middle school (same name). There is three private elementary and middle schools: Cornerstone Church And School, Holy Sprit Academy, and Shepheard of the Lakes Lutheran School.

References

External links
Brighton City Web Site

Cities in Livingston County, Michigan
Populated places established in 1832
1832 establishments in Michigan Territory